In enzyme kinetics, a secondary plot uses the intercept or slope from several Lineweaver–Burk plots to find additional kinetic constants.

For example, when a set of v by [S] curves from an enzyme with a ping–pong mechanism (varying substrate A, fixed substrate B) are plotted in a Lineweaver–Burk plot, a set of parallel lines will be produced.

The following Michaelis–Menten equation relates the initial reaction rate v0 to the substrate concentrations [A] and [B]:

The y-intercept of this equation is equal to the following:

The y-intercept is determined at several different fixed concentrations of substrate B (and varying substrate A). The y-intercept values are then plotted versus 1/[B] to determine the Michaelis constant for substrate B, as shown in the Figure to the right.

Secondary plot in inhibition studies
A secondary plot may also be used to find a specific inhibition constant, KI.

For a competitive enzyme inhibitor, the apparent Michaelis constant is equal to the following:

The slope of the Lineweaver-Burk plot is therefore equal to:

If one creates a secondary plot consisting of the slope values from several Lineweaver-Burk plots of varying inhibitor concentration [I], the competitive inhbition constant may be found.  The slope of the secondary plot divided by the intercept is equal to 1/KI.  This method allows one to find the KI constant, even when the Michaelis constant and vmax values are not known.

References 

Enzyme kinetics